Lake Township is a civil township of Roscommon County in the U.S. state of Michigan. The population was 1,119 at the 2020 census.

Communities
Houghton Point was settled along the northern shores of Houghton Lake in 1945. A post office opened on November 1, 1949 but is no longer in operation.
Michelson began as a railway station in 1904 along the Grand Rapids and Indiana Railroad. The community formed around a shingle mill and sawmill. A post office opened on June 1, 1909 but it no longer in operation.
The community is centered along M-55, which forms the boundary with Roscommon Township, and is just west of U.S. Route 127. The community was founded in 1906 and named after Roscommon Township supervisor Edward Nelson. A post office operated in Nellsville from August 20, 1906 until 1927.

Geography

The township surrounds the northwestern portion of Houghton Lake, and the western section of the township contains the Houghton Lake Flats Flooding State Wildlife Management Area and a portion of the Dead Stream Flooding State Wildlife Management Area.  A small portion of the Houghton Lake community extends into Lake Township.  The Houghton Lake 48629 ZIP Code serves the majority of the township, except a very small portion of the western edge served by the Merritt 49667 ZIP Code.

Demographics
As of the census of 2000, there were 1,351 people, 671 households, and 436 families residing in the township. The racial makeup of the township was 98.00% White, 0.30% African American, 0.81% Native American, 0.22% Asian, 0.07% from other races, and 0.59% from two or more races. Hispanic or Latino of any race were 0.52% of the population.

There were 671 households, out of which 12.4% had children under the age of 18 living with them, 56.9% were married couples living together, 5.8% had a female householder with no husband present, and 34.9% were non-families. 30.7% of all households were made up of individuals, and 16.5% had someone living alone who was 65 years of age or older.  The average household size was 2.00 and the average family size was 2.41.

In the township the population was spread out, with 12.1% under the age of 18, 4.8% from 18 to 24, 16.4% from 25 to 44, 36.3% from 45 to 64, and 30.4% who were 65 years of age or older.  The median age was 56 years. For every 100 females, there were 94.9 males.  For every 100 females age 18 and over, there were 92.5 males.

The median income for a household in the township was $29,242, and the median income for a family was $34,821. Males had a median income of $31,125 versus $18,523 for females. The per capita income for the township was $20,793.  About 9.7% of families and 14.3% of the population were below the poverty line, including 20.0% of those under age 18 and 7.5% of those age 65 or over.

References

Sources

Townships in Roscommon County, Michigan
Townships in Michigan